Andrew Eustace Palmer, CMG, CVO (30 September 1937 - 13 November 2019) was a British diplomat, and Her Britannic Majesty's Ambassador to the Holy See 1991-1995.

He was educated at Winchester College and the University of Cambridge. He also attended the Royal College of Defence Studies, and Harvard University. He was married to Davina (Barclay) from 1962.

Palmer was Ambassador to Cuba 1986-1988, and Private Secretary to TRH The Duke and Duchess of Kent 1988-1990. He retired from the Diplomatic Service, which he joined in 1961, in 1995. He then held a number of positions at the University of Reading, where he was awarded the Degree of Hon D Litt in March 2016.

He died on 13 November 2019 at the age of 82. A service of thanksgiving for his life was held in St. Barnabas' Church, Peasemore, Berkshire on 9 December 2019.

References

See also
British Ambassadors to the Holy See.

1937 births
2019 deaths
Ambassadors of the United Kingdom to Cuba
Harvard University alumni
People educated at Winchester College
Ambassadors of the United Kingdom to the Holy See
Graduates of the Royal College of Defence Studies